Port Snettisham is a narrow fjord  southeast of Juneau in the U.S. state of Alaska. It is a semi protected deep water port that was developed to transport many mineral deposits found in the Snettisham Peninsula.  Lieutenant Joseph Whidbey of the Royal Navy discovered the fjord on August 12, 1794; George Vancouver named it after the town of Snettisham in England.

Geography
The eastern shore to the north of Point Windham is a very large bay which is divided into two bays. The first bay is called the Holkham Bay and the other bay is named as Port Snettisham. Snettisham is an inland water way in the system of waterways in the partially protected system along the coasts of southeastern  Alaska and Canada. It is a deep water bay which was proposed to be developed to facilitate transportation of magnetite.

The fiord has three branches. Snettisham post office is situated on the north end of this peninsula and  inside the entrance to Port Snettisham.

People
Historically, the Taku people have had several settlements at Port Snettisham, and still visit the area to fish, particularly for sockeye salmon.

Economy

Several mineral deposits were discovered in the drainage basin of the port. It was suggested in 1954 to establish a small dock, deep enough for large ocean-going vessels. Of all the deposits developed, gold was the chief mineral output, mined by the Alaska Snettisham Gold Mining Company which was established on the south shore of the Port Snettisham,   from the entrance.

The quartz ledge which constitutes the Crystal Mine was discovered by B. Heins in 1895.  A 20-stamp mill was in operation by 1901.  This mine was purchased in 1903 by the Alaska Snettisham Gold Mining Company, but operations were discontinued by 1905.

See also
Juneau gold belt

References
 This article contains public domain text from A.C. Spencer's "The Juneau gold belt, Alaska: A reconnaissance of Admiralty Island, Alaska" (1906)

Fjords of Alaska
Bodies of water of Juneau, Alaska